Nebria andarensis is a species of ground beetle in the Nebriinae subfamily that is endemic to Spain.

References

External links
Nebria andarensis at Fauna Europaea

andarensis
Beetles described in 1923
Beetles of Europe
Endemic fauna of Spain
Taxa named by Ignacio Bolívar